Merrill P. Barber (December 18, 1910 – December 21, 1985) was the mayor of Vero Beach, Florida from December 10, 1947, to December 14, 1949. He was a member of the Florida Senate from the 12th District from 1954 to 1958 and from the 29th District from 1963 to 1968.

He was born in Marshall, Missouri in 1911, the son of Merrill J Barber and Lelia E Barber. He came with his family to Vero Beach in 1913 at the age of three.

He was President of the Indian River County Citrus Bank.

Legacy 
The Merrill P. Barber Bridge is named for him.

References 

1910 births
1985 deaths
Democratic Party Florida state senators
Mayors of Vero Beach, Florida
People from Marshall, Missouri
20th-century American politicians